Amara Kaaviyam is a 2014 Indian Tamil-language romantic thriller film written and directed by Jeeva Shankar and produced by Arya. The film stars Arya's younger brother Sathya and Miya. The movie features a successful soundtrack composed by Ghibran. It opened to mixed reviews in September 2014. The film was remade in Bengali in 2020 as Love Story.

Plot 
The movie begins with Jeeva being taken to court, where he recalls his past. In 1989, at the beginning of his 12th standard, his friend Balaji falls in love with their classmate Karthika. Jeeva talks to Karthika but learns that she is actually in love with him. The next day, he accepts her love. Jeeva's father died when he was young, and his mother married again. Once when Jeeva and Karthika are out, they are caught by police, and both their families are informed. Later, when Jeeva goes to apologize to Karthika's parents, he is hit by her father. Meanwhile, Karthika's father applies for a transfer. Jeeva and Karthika promise that they will not meet until their last exam. On the last day, Karthika leaves but gives a letter to Balaji and tells him to give it to Jeeva, but Balaji does not give it and tries to convince Jeeva that Karthika does not love him anymore.

Jeeva and Karthika try to meet each other but in vain. Finally, Jeeva learns Karthika's whereabouts, and they finally meet. When he meets her, he lands up in a fight with her friend. He goes to her home and asks her if she still loves him. She says no but later feels she should talk to him and marry him the way he asked her as proof, but fate has other plans. The next day when she meets him, he stabs her before she can say anything and later realizes she is still in love with him. He tries to save her, but she dies in his arms. The scene returns to the present, where Jeeva escapes from the police to find Karthika's grave, then he jumps off a cliff. The movie ends with Jeeva and Karthika united in heaven and their names written on the bark of the tree by Jeeva when they first met.

Cast

Production 
Following the critical and commercial success of his previous project Naan (2012), director Jeeva Shankar wrote a new script titled Amara Kaaviyam, a college love story set in the 1980s. Madhan of Escape Artistes Motion Pictures was to produce the film, while Yuvan Shankar Raja was announced as the music composer. Adharvaa was announced to play the lead role but consequently opted out during pre-production stages, and the production house dropped the film.

Jeeva Shankar replaced him with Sathya in September 2013 with Sathya's brother, Arya producing the film under his production house, The Show People. Malayalam actress Miya was signed to play the female lead role, making her debut in Tamil films. The film began production in October 2012 in Ooty, with costume designer Sai preparing clothes for the film's 1980s backdrop. Mia said that she played a school girl named Karthika in the film, a "very cute character", going on to add that she had to act in a lot of emotional scenes and that she would be seen mostly in the school uniform costume and the half saree. She had shot for 45 days in Ooty, with most of her scenes being shot in a set. Sathya played a school boy named Jeeva, a character that required him to shed more than 10 kg, with the actor stating that the film was an "intense love story...on the lines of Kaadhal Kondein (2003), 7G Rainbow Colony (2004), and Kaadhal (2004)".

Soundtrack 

The film's score and soundtrack were composed by Ghibran. The soundtrack album features six tracks, with lyrics written by Madhan Karky, Parvathy, P. Vetriselvan and Asmin. The album was released at Sathyam Cinemas on 28 June 2014 by actresses Trisha Krishnan and Nayantara while director Bala and actresses Pooja Umashankar, Lekha Washington and, Rupa Manjari were also present.

Jeeva Shankar stated that he told Ghibran that he wanted five melodious songs "that capture the spirit of young romance". Since the film was set in 1988–89, the director had wanted an 80s feel to the songs but Ghibran suggested a more contemporary sound, which, he felt, would appeal to modern-day audiences. Ghibran stated that there would be "subtle references" to the music of the period the film is set in, especially in the use of instruments. He also says he has used music bridges as the director had not placed any restriction on the length of the songs. Barring K. S. Chitra, no 80s singers sang the songs as the voices had to match the two young leads, with Ghibran adding that, since the film was about the journey of the two characters, the voices "mature as the film progresses".

The album received high praise from critics. The Times of India wrote, "This is an album that you will instantly take to and it is only going to grow on you even better, especially if you are in love. It is sure to figure in the Top 5 of the year's best film album". Behindwoods have 3.25 out of 5 and wrote, "Ghibran showcases poise, proficiency and pure melodies in this soul-stirring album". Indiaglitz.com wrote, "Ghibran is on a roll. What's so good to see is, the tunes let the lyrics to dominate and the freedom he gives to the singers to be imaginative. With this album he has gone a step further from being a bankable music director to a star composer. Like the title, the album will be remembered as an 'epic' in the years to come". musicaloud.com gave it a score of 8.5 out of 10 and wrote, "His Telugu debut may not have been up to his usual standards, but with Amara Kaaviyam, Ghibran continues to churn out top quality work in Tamil". Sify wrote, "Ghibran shoulders the movie by delivering his career best soundtrack and his re-recording is very refreshing too".

Release 
The satellite rights of the film were sold to STAR Vijay.

Critical reception 
The film received mixed reviews from critics. Sify wrote that "the movie moves at snail pace and the second half of the movie wanders aimlessly before convoluting in a tragic climax. Had the director tweaked his screenplay a little and had made it tight, Amara Kaaviyam would have lived up to its title". Behindwoods rated the film 2.75 out of 5 and noted that "Amara Kaviyam has brilliant music, great visuals, good acting, wish it had left little more impact". The Hindu noted that "Amara Kaaviyam, though fleetingly good, isn’t the thriller that it should have been, and isn’t the romance it intended to be". Rediff wrote "Director Jeeva Sankar has attempted to portray an intense love story and he does succeed to some extent".

References

External links 
 

2010s Tamil-language films
2014 films
2010s romantic thriller films
Films scored by Mohamaad Ghibran
Indian coming-of-age films
Indian romantic thriller films
Tamil films remade in other languages
2010s coming-of-age films